Wildflower Festival (or Wild Flower Festival) may refer to one of these annual events:

 Kings Park Festival, an annual September festival in Western Australia, formerly known as Perth's Wildflower Festival
 Wildflower Festival, an annual May event that includes the Wildflower Triathlon in California
 Wildflower! Arts and Music Festival, an annual spring festival held in Richardson, Texas
 Crested Butte Wildflower Festival, an annual July festival in Crested Butte, Colorado
 Great Smokies Wildflower Pilgrimage, a week-long annual April event in the Great Smoky Mountains National Park

See also 
 Wildflower (disambiguation)